North Fort Myers is an unincorporated area and census-designated place (CDP) in Lee County, Florida, United States. The population was 42,719 at the 2020 census. It is part of the Cape Coral-Fort Myers, Florida Metropolitan Statistical Area.

Geography
North Fort Myers is located in northern Lee County at  (26.7029, -81.8844), northwest across the Caloosahatchee River from Fort Myers proper. It is bordered to the west by the city of Cape Coral and to the north by Charlotte County.

Interstate 75 runs through North Fort Myers, with access from Exit 143 (Florida State Road 78). I-75 leads northwest  to the Sarasota area and south  to the Naples area, while SR-78 leads east  to LaBelle and west  to Pine Island Center. U.S. Route 41 (North Tamiami Trail) passes through the center of North Fort Myers, leading southeast across the Caloosahatchee Bridge into the center of Fort Myers and northwest  to Port Charlotte.

Demographics

As of the census of 2010, there were 39,330 people, 19,781 households, and 11,727 families residing in the CDP. There were 27,046 housing units, of which 7,265, or 26.9%, were vacant. 4,601 of the vacant units were for seasonal or recreational use. The racial makeup of the CDP was 94.7% White, 1.5% black, 0.4% Native American, 0.6% Asian, 0.1% Pacific Islander, 1.6% some other race, and 1.1% from two or more races. Hispanic or Latino of any race were 6.2% of the population.

Of the 19,781 households, 12.2% had children under the age of 18 living with them, 49.1% were headed by married couples living together, 6.8% had a female householder with no husband present, and 40.8% were non-families. 33.9% of all households were made up of individuals, and 22.0% were someone living alone who was 65 years of age or older. The average household size was 1.98, and the average family size was 2.45.

In the CDP, 10.8% of the population were under the age of 18, 4.1% were from 18 to 24, 12.3% were from 25 to 44, 29.3% were from 45 to 64, and 43.4% were 65 years of age or older. The median age was 61.8 years. For every 100 females, there were 93.4 males. For every 100 females age 18 and over, there were 91.6 males.

For the period 2013–17, the estimated median annual income for a household in the CDP was $39,876, and the median income for a family was $53,893. Male full-time workers had a median income of $41,079 versus $34,207 for females. The per capita income for the CDP was $26,891. About 9.0% of families and 13.8% of the population were below the poverty line, including 20.8% of those under age 18 and 8.3% of those age 65 or over.

Notable people
Noel Devine, Canadian Football League player
Mike Greenwell, MLB player and NASCAR Craftsman Truck Series driver 
Jeff Kottkamp, Florida lieutenant governor 
Mindy McCready, country music singer 
Deion Sanders, NFL player

References

Census-designated places in Lee County, Florida
Census-designated places in Florida